Chelonaplysilla violacea  is a species of sponge found mainly in New Zealand, but have been reported on both sides of the Pacific Ocean, including areas such as the Indo-Pacific, the United Arab Emirates, the Persian Gulf, Australia, and Hawaii. The color of the species is a reddish-mauve, their surface is opaque, membranous, and optically smooth, and their texture is slimy, soft, and compressible, with horny fibers protruding.

References

External links
 
 

violacea
Animals described in 1883